Benning National Forest was established by the U.S. Forest Service in Georgia on October 3, 1924 with  from Fort Benning.  On December 2, 1927 the transfer was rescinded.

References

External links
Forest History Society
Listing of the National Forests of the United States and Their Dates (from the Forest History Society website) Text from Davis, Richard C., ed. Encyclopedia of American Forest and Conservation History. New York: Macmillan Publishing Company for the Forest History Society, 1983. Vol. II, pp. 743-788.

Former National Forests that were military bases
Former National Forests of Georgia (U.S. state)